Cannabis in Korea may refer to:

Cannabis in North Korea
Cannabis in South Korea